Gertrude Price Wollner (May 15, 1900 – March 1985) was an American writer and composer. Her teachers included Albert Stossel, E. Robert Schmitz, and Emile Jacques Dalcroze. She married Herbert J. Wollner on April 2, 1926 and they had a daughter named Zelda. She published several articles about music education and one book, Improvisation in Music: Ways Toward Capturing Musical Ideas and Developing Them (1963). Wollner taught at Boston University, New England Conservatory of Music, and New York University. She believed that "For any age, a childlike attitude and tenacity of search are essential, and rewarding. Not all “creative” music-making needs to be great music that lasts forever. Through the doing, something genuine occurs which enhances all future music experience for the individual."

Wollner was an honorary member of Sigma Alpha Iota, the international music fraternity for women.

Selected works
Her compositions include:

Chamber 
Allegro (oboe and bassoon; 1950)
Cello Sonata (1946)
Quartet (English horn, violin, viola, and cello)
Trio (clarinet, violin, cello; 1950)

Orchestra 
Exaggerated Impressions (string orchestra and percussion)
Suite (string orchestra)

Piano 
A Dance to My Daughter
Impressions of Tour of Old Marblehead

Theatre 
After Paul Draper (1944)
Caesar and Cleopatra
Music-Narration-Pantomime-Dance
Reed Drum (1940)
Scarlet Letter

Vocal 
"Poem" (text by Rabindranath Tagore; 1937)
"These August Nights" (text by Melville Henry Cane; 1935)
We Catch a Fish (voice and orchestra)

References 

1900 births
1985 deaths
American women composers
American women non-fiction writers
20th-century American women writers
20th-century American women musicians
Boston University faculty
New England Conservatory faculty
New York University faculty
Sigma Alpha Iota